The constituency of Maheshpur is electoral district in the Indian state of Jharkhand for the Vidhan Sabha, the lower house of the state's parliament.

Overview
The constituency includes Maheshpur and Pakuria Police Stations in Pakur district.

This seat is reserved for Scheduled Tribes.

Maheshpur lies within the Rajmahal constituency for elections to the Lok Sabha,  India's national parliament.

Members of Legislative Assembly 
2005: Suphal Marandi, Jharkhand Mukti Morcha.
2009: Mistri Soren, Jharkhand Vikas Morcha
2014: Stephen Marandi, Jharkhand Mukti Morcha
2019: Stephen Marandi, Jharkhand Mukti Morcha

See also
Maheshpur block
Pakuria block
List of states of India by type of legislature

References

Assembly constituencies of Jharkhand